ICEE may refer to:

Conferences
International Conference on Electrical Engineering organized by the International Association of Engineers
International Conference on Emerging Electronics organized by the IEEE
International Conference on Emission Electronics organized by the IEEE
 Fourth International Conference on Environmental Education (ICEE), an environmental conference held in Ahmedabad, India in November 2007
International Conference on Environmental Ergonomics organized by the International Society of Environmental Ergonomics
International Conference on Environmental Enrichment organized by the volunteer organization Shape of Enrichment, Inc.
Fourth International Conference on Environmental Education

Companies and other organizations
The Icee Company
The Innovation Cluster for Entrepreneurship Education of the Erasmus+ Programme
The Institute for Community and Economic Engagement at the University of North Carolina at Greensboro
The International Committee for Exhibitions and Exchanges of the International Council of Museums

Other uses
The Innovation, Collaboration and Exchange Environment of the Defence Research and Development Canada government agency
Instrument Concepts for Europa Exploration of the Europa Multiple-Flyby Mission (also known as the Europa Clipper)
Ice-E, a character originating in the video game Undertale, and reappearing in its successor Deltarune